The Assistant Secretary of Defense for Special Operations/Low-Intensity Conflict or ASD(SO/LIC), is the principal civilian advisor to the U.S. Secretary of Defense on special operations and low-intensity conflict matters. Located within the Office of the Under Secretary of Defense for Policy (USD(P)), the ASD(SO/LIC) is responsible primarily for the overall supervision (to include oversight of policy and resources) of special operations and low-intensity conflict activities. These activities, according to USSOCOM's 2007 Posture Statement, include counterterrorism; unconventional warfare; direct action; special reconnaissance; foreign internal defense; civil affairs, information operations,  psychological operations, and counterproliferation of WMD.

In addition to policy oversight for special operations and stability operations capabilities, the ASD(SO/LIC) has policy oversight for strategic capabilities and force transformation and resources. This includes oversight of capability development to include general-purpose forces, space and information capabilities, nuclear and conventional strike capabilities, and missile defense. As such, ASD(SO/LIC), after the Secretary and Deputy Secretary, will be the principal official charged with oversight over all warfighting capabilities within the senior management of the Department of Defense. The ASD(SO/LIC) is considered part of the Office of the Secretary of Defense.

Structure
This position was mandated by the National Defense Authorization Act for  Fiscal Year  1987 (P.L. 99-661, passed 14 November 1986). The position was officially established on 4 January 1988, by Defense Directive 5138.3. The post's responsibilities for strategic capabilities and forces transformation were added as a result of USD(P) Eric Edelman's 2006 reorganization of the DoD policy office.

The ASD(SO/LIC) is supported in his/her work by three Deputy Assistant Secretaries of Defense:
 DASD, Special Operations and Combating Terrorism
 DASD, Partnership Strategy and Stability Operations
 DASD, Counternarcotics and Global Threats
In November 2020, Acting Secretary of Defense Christopher Miller announced that Christopher Maier, director of the wide ranging DoD Defeat-ISIS Task Force had resigned, and that the task-force director’s duties and responsibilities will be absorbed by the Office of the ASD (SO/LIC) and regional staffs of the Office of the Under Secretary of Defense for Policy.

Office holders
The table below includes both the various titles of this post over time, as well as all the holders of those offices.

Notes

References

External links
 policy.defense.gov